Alan Ryan (born 1940) is a British professor and lecturer.

Alan Ryan may also refer to:

 Alan Ryan (horror writer) (1943–2011), American author and editor
 Alan Ryan (footballer) (1909–?), Australian rules footballer
 Alan Ryan, Real IRA member killed in 2012; see Real Irish Republican Army

See also
 Allan Ryan (disambiguation)